Uptown (Korean: 업타운) was a pioneering South Korean hip hop group that formed in 1997. The group's four original members were Chris Jung, Carlos Galvan, Steve Kim and Tasha Reid.

The group underwent several line-up changes during the 90s and disbanded in 2000 following drug charges against Jung, Galvan, and Kim. When Reid left Uptown to pursue a solo career, the group made a comeback without her in 2006 with the album Testimony. Teenage rapper Jessica H. O. joined the group for the album. Jung was the only remaining original member on the group's 2009 album, New Era, which featured new members Maniac, Snacky Chan, and Swings. Uptown has been inactive since its 2010 album Surprise!

Original members
 Chris Jung
 Carlos Ricardo Galvan
 Steve Kim
 Tasha Reid

Other members
 Jessica H.O.
 Maniac
 Snacky Chan
 Swings

Discography
1997: Represent
1997: Represented...Now Believe
1998: Mutual Best
1998: Chapter 3 in History
1998: Absolute Power
1998: Verbal Medication
2000: History
2006: Testimony
2009: New Era
2010: Surprise!

Uptown 3000
Uptown members Carlos Galvan and Steve Kim formed a duo called Uptown 3000 in 2002. The duo was signed to a label in Atlanta, Georgia and was meant to break into the U.S. hip hop market. However, they released only one album, 2003's Same Book Different Chapter, before disbanding.

Awards

References

South Korean hip hop groups
South Korean pop music groups
Musical groups established in 1997
1997 establishments in South Korea